The canton of Maisons-Alfort is an administrative division of the Val-de-Marne department, Île-de-France region, northern France. It was created at the French canton reorganisation which came into effect in March 2015. Its seat is in Maisons-Alfort.

It consists of the following communes:
Maisons-Alfort

References

Cantons of Val-de-Marne